María Teresa Hincapié (1956 – 18 January 2008) was a Colombian performance artist. Performance art is presented in front of an audience embracing different forms of expressions like dance, theater, music, film and plastic art.

Life and career
She was born in 1956 in Armenia, the capital of the department of Quindio. Her initial studies were in acting and she developed her work towards the field of performance art, where she stood out as being at the vanguard of this artistic field in Colombia. Hincapié came from a dissociated discipline, at least in Colombia, called plastic art.
She studied in France, Indonesia, India and Japan where she became a versatile artist with various cultural influences.

In 1990 she obtained first prize at the XXXIII Salon of Colombian Artists with her work Una cosa es una cosa and became a member of the theatrical group 'Acto Latino' (Latin Act).

Hincapié worked with Colombian and Mexican play directors, choreographers and script writers Alvaro Restrepo and Juan Monsalve in Una cosa es una cosa, Parquedades, Vitrina, and Historias Del Silencio. The Performance She died from breast cancer on 18 January 2008.

Artistic career
1981 Historias Del Silencio (Stories of the Silence)
1984 Edipo Rey de Sófocles, directed by Juan Monsalve
1985 Monologue Ondina
1986  Desde La Huerta De Los Mundos
1987 Parquedades
1989  Vitrina
1989 Punto De Fuga
1990 Una cosa es una cosa
1996 Divina proporción
Unknown El espacio se mueve
Unknown Peregrinos urbanos

Recognition 
19901990, First prize at the Salon of Colombian Artists  with an eight-hour performance
1996 Primer premio XXXIV Salon of Colombian Artists, Bogotá;
2002 El espacio se mueve despacio (The Space Moves Slowly), Beca del Ministerio de Cultura, Sierra Nevada de Santa Marta.

Exhibitions
2001 I Bienal de Valencia - The Body of Art; Bienal de Valencia, Valencia Da Adversidade Vivemos - Artistes d'Amérique latine - Carte blanche à Carlos Bas; Musée d'Art Moderne de la Ville de Paris - MAM/ARC, Paris
2005 51st International Art Exhibition - Always a little further; La Biennale di Venezia, Venecia
2006 27° Bienal São Paulo; Fundação Bienal de São Paulo, São Paulo
2010 Frost Art Museum, FIU, Miami Florida; Installation and exhibit

References 

1956 births
2008 deaths
Colombian performance artists
Colombian women artists
People from Armenia, Colombia